Daniel Gabriel Alessandro Saucedo Grzechowski (born 25 February 1986), known professionally as Danny Saucedo or simply Danny, is a Swedish singer and songwriter. He rose to fame as one of the finalists in Idol 2006, the Swedish version of Idol, where he reached the top six.

Saucedo has released five studio albums and more than fifteen singles as a solo artist. His debut album Heart Beats and its three singles "Tokyo", "Play It for the Girls" and "Radio" topped the Swedish charts. He was simultaneously a member of Swedish pop trio E.M.D. with Erik Segerstedt and Mattias Andréasson, which was active between 2007 and 2010. The trio released three albums and eleven singles (of which one album and four singles topped the Swedish charts). The band won a Grammis for Song of The Year 2008 with "Jennie Let Me Love You". He has competed in Melodifestivalen four times, every time as both artist and songwriter. In 2009 E.M.D. finished third with "Baby Goodbye" and as a solo artist he finished second in 2011 with "In the Club", as well as in 2012 with "Amazing". He returned in 2021 with "Dandi dansa", qualifying direct to the final for a third time as a solo artist and finishing in seventh place in the final.

Personal life 
Saucedo was born in Stockholm to a Polish father and a Bolivian mother. As a student he attended the Adolf Fredrik's Music School in Stockholm. He speaks fluent English, Spanish, Polish  and French in addition to his native Swedish. Saucedo is a practicing Catholic.

Saucedo was in a relationship with Swedish singer Molly Sandén from 2013 to 2019, they were engaged in 2016. As of February 2020, Saucedo is in a relationship with model Anna Eriksson.

Career

2006: Idol and beginnings
Auditions
Danny embarked on his journey in Idol 2006 by auditioning with the song "I Swear" by the vocal quartet All-4-One. He was praised by the jury for his touching and convincing voice. Day joined fellow contestant Felicia Brandström in a duet, singing Bryan Adams' "(Everything I Do) I Do It for You", which according to the jury was the best performance so far in the Idol contest. The jury was unanimous in its opinion that if both were to continue at that level of that performance, they would easily end up in the Idol final. The jury's comments were harsh after Danny's performance of Nick Lachey's single "What's Left Of Me" in the Idol 2006 semi-finals, however, as they claimed his voice did not suit this song. In the top 11 finals, Danny sang The Jacksons' "Blame It on the Boogie" while doing some Michael Jackson moves. In the top 10 finals, Danny stormed the stage and made jury member Kishti Tomita weep in tears, while Danny sang the ballad "Öppna din dörr" by Swedish singer Tommy Nilsson.

Performances

In 2006, after end of the Idol season, he released his first single, a cover of "Öppna din dörr", a song by Tommy Nilsson. The debut single charted at #24 on the Swedish Singles Chart.

2007–2011: E.M.D.

Danny formed with previous Idol contestants Erik Segerstedt & Mattias Andréasson the Swedish pop band E.M.D., at the same time putting his solo output as well. Both Erik Segerstedt and Danny Saucedo had released successful solo albums, the first with his A Different Shade and the second with his album Heart Beats, during the Autumn of 2007, they formed alongside Mattias Andréasson the Swedish trio E.M.D. Their first single, a cover of Bryan Adams, Rod Stewart and Sting's hit "All For Love" rose to third place on Hitlistan. "All for Love" charted on Swedish national record chart immediately. The follow up was a debut album, A State of Mind, in May 2008. The album debuted at #1 on the Swedish Album Chart and produced three additional domestic chart topping singles after "All for Love", being "Jennie Let Me Love You", "Alone" and, after the deluxe album edition, the single "Baby Goodbye".

E.M.D participated in the 2009 Melodifestivalen with the track "Baby Goodbye", making it to the final, where they finished third. In November 2009 E.M.D. released their second album and first holiday album, Välkommen hem, containing Swedish Christmas music and the album's first and only single, Välkommen Hem, (originally sung by Magnus Carlsson) was released on 13 November 2009. E.M.D. finished the studio recording of their second studio album and third album overall entitled Rewind in 2010. The band released the first single from the album, "Save Tonight", a cover of a song by Eagle-Eye Cherry, followed by "What Is Love", a cover of a song by Haddaway, in 2010. The album was released on 3 December 2010 with the release of the "There's a Place for Us" as the album's third single. In late 2010, the band announced an indefinite breakup.

2007–2014: Solo career, new albums and Melodifestivalen
Saucedo was a contestant on the television show Let's Dance 2008 (Swedish version of Dancing With The Stars). In September 2008, Saucedo along with professional dancer Jeanette Carlsson, took part in the Eurovision Dance Contest 2008. The couple placed 12th in the final on September 6 in Glasgow. In October 2008 Danny revealed that he would be back with a new album in early 2009 and that the first single from it would be "Radio", which had been released top radio for airplay. The track was written by Michel Striton, who composed the song "If Only You", from the album Heart Beats. Danny's new album "Set Your Body Free" was released on Christmas Eve 2008 in Sweden. He later appeared in the music video for "Victorious", by Velvet and Linda Bengtzing. Furthermore, Saucedo participated in Melodifestivalen 2011 as a solo artist, singing the song "In the Club". He qualified for the final that was held on 12 March 2011 and came second in votes to the winning song "Popular" by Eric Saade. Danny garnered 149 points to Saade's 193 points. He later presented the Swedish votes at finals of Eurovision Song Contest 2011. In 2012, he made a return to the Melodifestivalen 2012 for another chance to represent Sweden at the Eurovision Song Contest 2012 with the song "Amazing". He performed on the semi-final 4, on 25 February and later on advanced into the finals. However, in the finals, he came in second place again to the winning song "Euphoria" by Loreen. Saucedo had garnered 198 points to Loreen's 268 points. In 2013, he hosted Melodifestivalen 2013 with Gina Dirawi. Saucedo has also been active as a songwriter and has composed songs for Alcazar and Pulse.

2015–present: Så mycket bättre and touring 
In 2016, Saucedo participated in the Swedish TV-show Så mycket bättre, which was broadcast on TV4. Having scored more than 13 Top 40 hits in his native Sweden, he was well fit for the show, since the show's general premise is that each artist is supposed to make their own version of other artist's well known songs. Saucedo participated in the show again in 2019. He has in recent years been touring in Sweden, most recently with "The Run(A)way Show", which received acclaim from critics. In March 2020, some of Saucedo's shows had to be canceled, due to the amid arising concerns regarding the COVID-19 pandemic.

He participated in Melodifestivalen 2021, when he qualified for the finale, held on 13 March 2021. He finished in seventh place with 74 points; 39 points from the international juries and 35 points from televoting.

Discography

Albums

Singles

As part of E.M.D.

E.M.D. broke up in late 2010.

Albums
 2008: A State of Mind
 2009: A State of Mind (Deluxe Edition)
 2009: Välkommen hem
 2010: Rewind

Singles
 2007: "All for Love"
 2008: "Jennie Let Me Love You"
 2008: "Alone"
 2009: "Baby Goodbye"
 2009: "Youngblood"
 2009: "Välkommen hem"
 2010: "Save Tonight"
 2010: "What Is Love" (Cover of Haddaway's original)

Notes

References

External links 

 The Official Website 
 The Official Fanclub
 Danny's Official Idol Blog
 Danny's Myspace Fanclub

1986 births
21st-century Swedish singers
E.M.D. members
English-language singers from Sweden
Idol (Swedish TV series) participants
Living people
Musicians from Stockholm
Singers from Stockholm
Swedish-language singers
Swedish people of Bolivian descent
Swedish people of Polish descent
Swedish pop singers
Swedish Roman Catholics
21st-century Swedish male singers
Melodifestivalen contestants of 2021
Melodifestivalen contestants of 2012
Melodifestivalen contestants of 2011
Melodifestivalen contestants of 2009